Wong Chun Fan (born 23 September 1969) is a Hong Kong badminton player. She competed in women's singles at the 1992 Summer Olympics in Barcelona.

References

External links

1969 births
Living people
Hong Kong female badminton players
Olympic badminton players of Hong Kong
Badminton players at the 1992 Summer Olympics
Badminton players at the 1994 Asian Games
Asian Games competitors for Hong Kong
Medallists at the 1994 Commonwealth Games
Commonwealth Games bronze medallists for Hong Kong
Commonwealth Games medallists in badminton